Marlon Ricardo van der Sander (born 2 October 1961) is a Dutch former professional footballer.

Career 
Having played for South China, van der Sander signed for Hong Kong First Division side Golden in August 1994.

While in Hong Kong, he also was selected in a Hong Kong League XI team, composed of Hong Kong First Division League players in exhibition matches. On 26 May 1996, he played for Hong Kong XI against England in a 0-1 loss for Hong Kong XI.

References 

1961 births
Living people
Dutch footballers
Association football defenders
Terengganu FC players
Sportkring Sint-Niklaas players
South China AA players
Sun Hei SC players
Sing Tao SC players
Hong Kong FC players
Hong Kong First Division League players
Dutch expatriate footballers
Dutch expatriate sportspeople in Malaysia
Dutch expatriate sportspeople in Hong Kong
Expatriate footballers in Malaysia
Expatriate footballers in Hong Kong